Agonum piceum is a species of ground beetle in the Platyninae subfamily that can be found everywhere in Europe except for Albania, Andorra, Monaco, Portugal, San Marino, Spain, Vatican City and various European islands.

References

Beetles described in 1758
Beetles of Europe
piceum
Taxa named by Carl Linnaeus